The Governor's School of Southside Virginia is a public magnet high school in Keysville, Virginia and Alberta, Virginia. The Governor's School of Southside Virginia is located at Southside Virginia Community College—John H. Daniel campus just outside Keysville, Virginia and the Christanna campus near Alberta, Virginia.  It is one of 18 magnet Governor's Schools in Virginia.

The Governor's School of Southside Virginia covers the city of Danville; and the counties of Amelia, Brunswick, Buckingham, Charlotte, Cumberland, Greensville, Lunenburg, Mecklenburg, Nottoway and Prince Edward.

References

Public high schools in Virginia
Magnet schools in Virginia
Schools in Charlotte County, Virginia
Educational institutions with year of establishment missing